Caj Torsten Westerberg (born 14 June 1946 in Porvoo) is a Finnish poet and translator. Among his several awards, he is the recipient of the Eino Leino Prize in 1995, State Prize for Translation in 1984 and State Prize for Literature twice, in 1970 and 1986. In 2012 he was the recipient of Dancing Bear Poetry Prize by Finnish Broadcasting Company for his excellent poetry translations from the past two decades of the Swedish poet Tomas Tranströmer.

Works 
 Onnellisesti valittaen, 1967
 Runous, 1968
 En minä ole ainoa kerta, 1969
 Uponnut Venetsia, 1972
 Äänesi, 1974
 Kallista on ja halvalla menee, 1975
 Reviirilaulu, 1978
 Elämän puu, 1981
 Kirkas nimetön yö, 1985
 Toteutumattomat kaupungit, Runoja 1967–1985, 1987
 Että näkyisi valona vedessä, 1991
 Läikehtien rientävät pilvinä kivet, 1992
 Ataraksia, 2003
 Yönmusta, sileä, 2011

References

Finnish writers
Finnish translators
Translators to Finnish
Translators from Swedish
Recipients of the Eino Leino Prize
Living people
1946 births
People from Porvoo